Hyalopilitic is a textural term used in petrographic classification of volcanic rocks.  Specifically, hyalopilitic refers to a volcanic rock groundmass, which is visible only under magnification with a petrographic microscope, that contains a mixture of very fine-grained mineral crystals either mixed with natural volcanic glass, or surrounded by thin bands of volcanic glass.

See also
 List of rock textures
 Rock microstructure
 Obsidian

Igneous petrology
Volcanic rocks